The Billboard Hot 100 is a chart that ranks the best-performing singles of the United States. Its data, published by Billboard magazine and compiled by Nielsen SoundScan, is based collectively on each single's weekly physical and digital sales, as well as airplay and streaming.

During 2016, ten singles reached number one on the Hot 100; an eleventh single, "Hello" by Adele, began its run at number one in November 2015. Of those ten number-one singles, five were collaborations. In total, fourteen acts topped the chart as either lead or featured artists, with nine—Zayn, Desiigner, Wizkid, Kyla, Sia, The Chainsmokers, Halsey, Rae Sremmurd and Gucci Mane—achieving their first Hot 100 number-one single. The Chainsmokers and Halsey's "Closer" was the longest-running number-one of the year, leading the chart for twelve weeks; despite this, Justin Bieber's "Love Yourself" topped the Billboard Year-End Hot 100.

Chart history

Number-one artists

See also 
2016 in American music
List of Billboard 200 number-one albums of 2016
List of Billboard Hot 100 top 10 singles in 2016

References 

United States Hot 100
2016
Hot 100 number-one singles